CSCF may refer to:

Canadian Ski Coaches Federation
IP Multimedia Subsystem#CSCF – Call Session Control Function